The 1921 South Australian Football League season was the 42nd season of the top-level Australian rules football competition in South Australia.

The competition expanded from seven to eight teams with  being admitted to the seniors after one year in the B Grade (Reserves).

,  also made the top (final) four teams and participated in the finals series. Glenelg finished winless (as they also did in next three seasons 1922–1924) to "win" the wooden spoon in its first season.

Ladder

1921 SAFL Finals

Week 4 (1921 SAFL Grand Final)

References

SAFL
South Australian National Football League seasons